The Lucky Tattie is a type of traditional sweet made in Scotland. The lucky tattie is made of a white fondant solid core flavoured with cassia, and steamed and covered with cinnamon powder. The tattie used to contain a small plastic lucky charm in the centre (like a tiny animal or toy), hence the lucky.  Due to health and safety they were removed.

See also
 List of steamed foods

References

External links
Image of lucky tatties

Scottish confectionery
Steamed foods